Astria Suparak is an American artist and curator from Los Angeles, California. Suparak has curated events and exhibitions for Eyebeam, The Kitchen, PS1, Yerba Buena Center for the Arts, Museo Tamayo (Mexico City), Anthology Film Archives, Liverpool Biennial and Yale University and a number of alternative venues.

Suparak was director of the Warehouse Gallery (Syracuse University) from 2006-2007 and the Pratt Film Series (Pratt Institute) from 1998-2000. Suparak was the director of Miller Gallery at Carnegie Mellon University where she curated a number of exhibitions including The Yes Men’s first retrospective exhibition "Keep It Slick: Infiltrating Capitalism with The Yes Men" and "Alien She," an exhibition on the impact of punk feminist movement Riot Grrrl on contemporary culture.

Selected works

Asian futures, without Asian (2020 - Current) 
Asian futures, without Asians is a series of new multimedia presentation by Suparak, which asks: “What does it mean when so many white filmmakers envision futures inflected by Asian culture, but devoid of actual Asian people?” The work is a one-hour long illustrated lecture that examines nearly 50 years of American science fiction cinema through the lens of Asian appropriation and whitewashing. The research-creation project examines how Asian cultures have been mixed and matched to create an interchangeable “Asian-ness” within futuristic sci-fi.

The performance lecture is includes images from dozens of futuristic movies and TV shows where she discusses the implications of not only borrowing heavily from Asian cultures, but at the same time decontextualizing and misrepresenting them. Her work also address the exclusion of Asian bodies in the imagination of high tech futures with Asian characteristics and architecture. She explores troupes such as Anglicized names, chopsticks, bastardization of traditional garments and head gears or hair styles and usage of Asian inspired architectures and interior spaces. Some films that Suparak criticizes in the work includes Blade Runner, Flash Gordon, Star Trek, 2001: A Space Odyssey, Soylent Green, Logan’s Run, and the Star Wars franchise.

The work has been presented at MoMa, Jacob Lawrence Gallery (University of Washington), The Wattis Institute (San Francisco) (presented with the launch of the publication, Why are they so afraid of the lotus? ISBN 978-3-95679-569-5, ICA LA (Los Angeles) (co-presented by GYOPO), Bard College (Annandale-On-Hudson, NY), George Mason University (Fairfax, VA), Centre A: Vancouver International Centre for Contemporary Asian Art (Vancouver, BC) and Spike Island,Reed College (Portland, OR)

Other Projects 

 "Alien She"A major exhibition examining the lasting impact of the Riot Grrrl movement on contemporary artists and cultural producers, curated by Suparak and Ceci Moss.
 "Whatever It Takes: Steelers Fan Collections, Rituals, and Obsessions": Suparak and artist Jon Rubin curated the first exhibition that explored sports fan culture, based on the Pittsburgh football team, The Steelers.
 "Keep It Slick: Infiltrating Capitalism with The Yes Men : This was the first solo exhibition and retrospective of The Yes Men.
 "Some Kind of Loving": This was a curated video compilation produced by Joanie 4 Jackie, a movie distribution project produced by artist Miranda July, in 2000.

References

External links 
 Official website

American curators
American women curators
Living people
Artists from Los Angeles
Year of birth missing (living people)
21st-century American women